Barbara Pratt (born February 16, 1963) is a Canadian painter based in Portugal Cove-St. Philip's Newfoundland.

Pratt grew up in the community of St. Catherine's in St. Mary's Bay, Newfoundland. She attended Rothesay Netherwood School and graduated with a BA from Acadia University. In her early work, she almost exclusively painted the human figure, with a particular emphasis on clothing. Other subjects include flowers and oil tankers related to Newfoundland's offshore oil industry. Her first solo exhibition was held in 1986 at the Spurrell Gallery in St. John's. In 2010 she had an exhibit based on a train trip from Toronto to Vancouver. Two years later her work was shown at the McMichael Canadian Art Collection.

Pratt is the daughter of painters Christopher Pratt and Mary Pratt (née West). In 2020, she paid homage to her mother in an exhibit entitled Cake, held in St. John's.

Collections
The Rooms Provincial Art Gallery, St. John's
Memorial University of Newfoundland and Labrador, St. John's

References

1963 births
Living people
Artists from Newfoundland and Labrador
Canadian women painters
People from Portugal Cove-St. Philip's
20th-century Canadian painters
20th-century Canadian women artists
21st-century Canadian painters
21st-century Canadian women artists
Acadia University alumni